Shediac-Beaubassin-Cap-Pelé is a provincial electoral district for the Legislative Assembly of New Brunswick, Canada.  It was created in 1973 as Shediac.  Though it has had few geographic changes over the years, it has twice been renamed to more inclusively reflect the communities within its boundaries, first to Shediac-Cap-Pelé in 1994 and then to Shediac-Beaubassin-Cap-Pelé in 2013.

Members of the Legislative Assembly

Election results

Shediac-Beaubassin-Cap-Pelé

Shediac-Cap-Pelé

Shediac

References

External links 
Website of the Legislative Assembly of New Brunswick

New Brunswick provincial electoral districts
Shediac
1973 establishments in New Brunswick
Constituencies established in 1973